The 1990–91 season was Mansfield Town's 54th season in the Football League and 20th in the Third Division they finished in 24th position with 38 points and were relegated to the Fourth Division.

Final league table

Results

Football League Third Division

FA Cup

League Cup

League Trophy

Squad statistics
 Squad list sourced from

References
General
 Mansfield Town 1990–91 at soccerbase.com (use drop down list to select relevant season)

Specific

Mansfield Town F.C. seasons
Mansfield Town